A Vatara is a type of housing, similar to an apartment complex, typically found in urban Karnataka, India. Vataras usually are single floor or have two stories, with a row of homes on each floor. They usually have a common corridor in the middle. They are usually occupied by middle-class families and students and typically have a single owner, who may or may not live in the same vatara. Akin to the chawls of Mumbai, it is a typology that has emerged as a cost-effective form of multiple housing.

In popular culture
Life in vataras is portrayed in some Kannada films, e.g. Ganeshana Maduve directed by Phani Ramachandra. A popular TV serial in Kannada called Vatara (featuring the popular actor "Comedy Time" Ganesh) portrayed life in a vatara in Bengaluru.

Buildings and structures in Karnataka
House types